Vinoř is a municipal district (městská část) in Prague, Czech Republic.

See also
 Vinoř Cricket Ground

References

Districts of Prague